The Anchorage Times was a daily newspaper published in Anchorage, Alaska, that became known for the pro-business political stance of longtime publisher and editor, Robert Atwood. Competition from the McClatchy-owned Anchorage Daily News forced it out of business in 1992.

History
The Anchorage Times was founded by Ted Needham and L. Frank Shaw as the Pioneer-News. The first issue, an advertisement-heavy "extra" edition, was published on May 27, 1915, and distributed without charge. The headline story was "Status of the New Townsite." It was the first newspaper published in the town, which was not yet formally known as "Anchorage." Regular weekly publication, as the Cook Inlet Pioneer and Knik News began on June 5, 1915, and daily publication began in October using equipment purchased from the defunct Cordova Daily Alaskan. The paper was sold to Charlie Herron in the spring of 1916, and on May 24 changed its name to The Anchorage Daily Times & Cook Inlet Pioneer. On May 29, 1917, it became the Anchorage Daily Times. In December 1924, it was sold to cover debts to a group headed by Bank of Alaska president Edward A. Rasmuson and Jacob B. Gottstein.

Bob Atwood takes the reins

In June 1935, 28-year-old Robert Bruce Atwood, Edward Rasmuson's son-in-law, arrived in Anchorage from Worcester, Massachusetts.  Atwood had been brought to Alaska by Rasmuson to assume the position of editor-publisher of the paper, which at that time had a circulation of 650.  He would hold the position until 1990.

During the war years, Anchorage's population swelled from less than 8,000 to over 43,000, overtaking Fairbanks as Alaska's largest city, and making the Times Alaska's largest daily newspaper.

In 1947, Alaska territorial governor Ernest Gruening appointed Atwood to chair the Alaska Statehood Committee. In Atwood's hands, the Anchorage Daily Times became a prominent voice for statehood.

Competition

A rival, the Anchorage Daily News, began publishing in 1948, having begun as a weekly two years earlier.  Although initially more of an editorial challenge than a competitive threat, the contest would influence the course of both newspapers over the next few decades.  In 1974, the Times and the Daily News entered into a joint operating agreement in order to reduce costs. Later that year, the Times would begin issuing a Sunday edition. The Daily News had been publishing Sundays since 1965.

The Anchorage Daily Times was renamed the Anchorage Times in 1976.  In 1977, the Daily News filed suit against the Times, claiming violations of the joint operating agreement.  Atwood countered that the Daily News was really to blame for their own troubles, citing the discontinuation of subsidies to the paper by Ted Field, the son of Daily News publisher Kay Fanning and heir to the Marshall Field fortune.

The papers reached an out-of-court settlement in 1978, and the agreement was terminated in 1979. In the short term, this was a setback for the struggling Daily News, which was compelled to seek outside investors. The Sacramento-based McClatchy newspaper chain, bought the Daily News that same year.

McClatchy's investment fueled an all-out circulation war.  By 1984, readership of the Times had fallen behind that of the Daily News. In an interview with the Alaska Journal of Commerce,  Times editor and assistant publisher, Bill Tobin, traced the paper's ultimate failure to the late '80s, and to publisher Robert Atwood's resistance of the morning format. The Times remained an afternoon paper, whereas the Daily News had been publishing a morning edition since 1964.

Veco and the Voice of the Times
In 1989, Atwood sold the Times to Veco Corporation, an oilfield service company seeking to invest its profits from the clean-up efforts following the Exxon Valdez oil spill. The new management was not able to turn the paper around, and after two and a half years and claimed losses of $10 million, a decision was made to shut down operations. The paper's assets were sold to McClatchy, and the last issue of the Anchorage Times was published on June 3, 1992.

A ten-year deal was inked to maintain the editorial voice of the defunct paper by way of a half-page Voice of the Times section opposite the Daily News editorial page. In 2002, this deal was renewed for another five years. On May 10, 2007, several days after Veco CEO and Voice of the Times publisher Bill Allen pleaded guilty to political bribery charges, the Daily News announced that it would terminate the agreement at the end of that month. In June, the Voice of the Times began publishing an exclusively online edition.  In October 2008, the Voice of the Times announced that it would stop publishing, with a probable final date of November 1, 2008.

Known Editors
 Frank L. Shaw (or L.F. Shaw), 1915–1916, 1916-1919
 Harry G. Steel, 1916
 James Wilbur Ward, 1919-1920
 Edgar L. Bedell, 1920-1925
 Roy Gratton Southworth, 1925–1927, 1931-1933
 Charles Fisk, 1927-1931
 Charles Settlemier, 1933-1935
 Robert Atwood, 1935-1990
 Bill Tobin, 1963-1992
 Fred Dickey, 1980-1981
 J. Randolph Murray, 1989-1992

See also
 Alaska Statehood Act
 History of Anchorage, Alaska
 List of defunct newspapers of the United States

References

External links
 The on-line "Voice of the Times"
 "Voice of the Times" at the Anchorage Daily News (to May 2007)
 Alaska Newspaper Project

1915 establishments in Alaska
1992 disestablishments in Alaska
Companies based in Anchorage, Alaska
Defunct newspapers published in Alaska
Mass media in Anchorage, Alaska
Publications disestablished in 1992
Publications established in 1915